Shanga is a Local Government Area in Kebbi State, Nigeria. Its headquarters are in the town of Shanga.

It has an area of 1,642 km and a population of 127,146 at the 2006 census.

The postal code of the area is 870.

References

Local Government Areas in Kebbi State